Mead is an unincorporated suburb and census-designated place north of Spokane in Spokane County, Washington, United States.  Named for Civil War general George Meade,  this rural area is tracked by the United States Census Bureau. As of 2010, the population of Mead was 7,275.

In 1900 Mead was the second stop on the Spokane Falls & Northern Railway.  The community included the Cushing & Bryant general store, a blacksmith shop, a public school with approximately 60 students, a Methodist Episcopal church, and a Sunday school.  At the time the post office was located in the Cushing & Bryant store.

Mead is home to the computer game development firm, Cyan Worlds, makers of Myst and Riven. The Kaiser Aluminum Mead Works, which operated as a leading area employer from 1942 until curtailment in 2001, is nearby. Mead is also home to the Hierophant Meadery, makers of Metheglin-style mead, otherwise known as honey wine.

Education
The Mead School District, which is named after the town of Mead where its first school was built, enrolls approximately 9000 students in two high schools, two middle schools, and eight elementary schools. Until 2019, the district had two choice high schools: Riverpoint Academy, a project-based STEAM+ high school, and M.E.A.D., an alternative high school. In 2019, facing financial and political pressure, the district closed both schools.

References

External links
Mead School District

Census-designated places in Spokane County, Washington
Census-designated places in Washington (state)